The Nauru Congregational Church (NCC) is the largest religious denomination in Nauru, claiming as members approximately 60% of Nauru's population of about 10,000.

The NCC is a Protestant Congregationalist denomination. It has seven congregations in Nauru. Each of the congregations is headed by a deacon. Rene Harris, also a former Nauruan president, has served as the general secretary of the church.

Notes

Congregationalist denominations
Reformed denominations in Oceania
Churches in Nauru